The Torcida Jovem are a torcida organizada, or supporters' group, for Santos FC, a Brazilian professional football club based in Santos, Brazil. Founded in 1969 by a group of fans from São Paulo, the group set out to make it a goal to attend every match that the club played in the capital of São Paulo. With over 70,000 members, it is one of the largest supporting groups in Brazil. The current president is André Vinícius "Deko". Grêmio Recreativo Cultural Social Escola de Samba Torcida Jovem, popularly known simply as Torcida Jovem, is a samba school from São Paulo, Brazil.

History 

During the late 1960s when Santos FC fan base did not extend beyond the limits of the city of Santos, a group of men made a point to attend every game the team played in São Paulo. After a few matches, the group began to arrange together trips to any state venue to popularize the idea o support the club, and negate the provocations of other rival fans. The habit of attending the club's matches en masse became so common that in 1969 they decided to give birth to a uniformed, official supporters group that attended every game the team disputes. Thirteen individuals were the driving force behind the creation of Torcida Jovem, with Cosmo Damião, German, Toboggan, Menezes, Celso Jatene, Mestre Pedrão, China, Chacrinha, Magrão, Zuca, Almir and Zé Miguel being the principal de facto leaders. On September 26, 1969, when the club returned from another successful tour, unbeaten in a series of seven matches in Europe, the group gathered in an old house in the traditional neighborhood of Brás in São Paulo. It was decided to name the group Torcida Jovem since the founders were no older than 21 years of age. Cosmo's house became the first official seat of the first organized supporters group for Santos FC. The firm's first witness of the club's success came on November 19 of that same year in Rio de Janeiro. In a match against Vasco da Gama, Pelé, named the "Athlete of the Century" by the International Olympic Committee, and widely regarded among football historians, former players and fans to be one of the best and most accomplished footballers in the game's history. scored his 1,000th goal in the Maracanã. The following year, the Torcida Jovem made themselves present during Brazil's victorious campaign during the 1970 FIFA World Cup.

Classifications

See also 
 Roman Catholic Archdiocese of São Paulo
 Vai-Vai
 Carrão (São Paulo Metro)
 Penha (São Paulo Metro)
 Line 3 (São Paulo Metro)
 Brazilian Carnival
 Carnival of São Paulo
 Sambadrome
 Anhembi Sambadrome
 Samba school
 Float (parade)
 Bateria
 Mano Brown
 Nasser Al-Khelaifi
 Diadema, São Paulo
 Independent League of the Samba Schools of São Paulo

Notes

References

External links

 

 
Gymnasium of Torcida Jovem at Facebook
Gymnasium of Torcida Jovem at Foursquare
Gymnasim of Torcida Jovem at Google Maps
Head Office of Torcida Jovem at WikiMapia
Shed of Torcida Jovem in City of Samba at OpenStreetMap
Conmebol Libertadores

Carnival

Association football supporters' associations
Santos FC
1969 establishments in Brazil
Samba schools of São Paulo